The 304th Rescue Squadron is an Air Force Reserve Command combat search and rescue unit located at Portland Air National Guard Base, Oregon. The squadron is a geographically separated unit assigned to the 943d Rescue Group at Davis–Monthan Air Force Base, Arizona, and the 920th Rescue Wing at Patrick Space Force Base, Florida.

Mission
The peacetime mission of the 304th is to train and maintain rescue capability for Department of Defense personnel, humanitarian and disaster relief activities.  The 304th's wartime mission is to provide combat rescue capabilities to recover downed aircrew members and isolated personnel. They can provide this capability under the harshest of circumstances to include, day/night, inclement weather and all terrain rescue conditions.

Astronaut recovery 
The 304th will also be responsible for recovery of astronauts landed in US spacecraft off American shore. For that mission, the squadron will have 3 teams ready.

During ascent for Starliner, Dragon, and Orion, the 304th Rescue Squadron will have two teams stationed along the east coast of the United States, one at Patrick Space Force Base (just South of the Cape) and the other in Charleston, South Carolina. The Patrick SFB team, Rescue 1, will be responsible for on-pad aborts that place a capsule in the water or for aborts in the first couple minutes of flight that place the capsule within a 200 nautical mile zone from the Cape. After that distance is exceeded, the Charleston crew (Rescue 2) would be responsible for rescue of a launch-aborting crew vehicle anywhere else across the Atlantic. The third team, stationed in Hawai’i, (also part of Rescue 2) would be responsible for any after-launch immediate landing need or off-nominal Station return contingency that places a Starliner or Dragon in the Pacific. If an off-nominal from orbit return occurred with splashdown in the Atlantic, an emergency ocean return within 200 nautical miles of Cape Canaveral would fall to Rescue 1. Any other Atlantic splashdown would fall to Rescue 2 from Charleston because they have more powerful aircraft that could reach Starliner or Dragon or Orion quicker than the Patrick support craft.

Rescue 1 carries a requirement to have a crew en route back to land within 6 hours of splashdown. Rescue 2 carries a requirement to have the hatch on a capsule opened within 24 hours of splashdown and a crew evacuated (via helicopter or ship) from the sea landing area within 72 hours of hatch open.

History
The 304th trained for combat search and rescue (CSAR) capability from its inception.  The 304th was activated in the Reserves on 16 November 1957 at Portland IAP.  In 1961, Pararescuemen (PJs) were added to the unit. Since then, the 304th has been training, equipping and employing Combat Rescue Officers, PJs, and support personnel worldwide in support of U.S. national security interests. It performed search, rescue, and medical evacuation missions primarily in the Northwestern United States, including over 100 missions immediately following the Mount St. Helens volcanic eruption in May 1980. The unit responded to the crash of United Flight 173 in 1978. It maintained helicopter air refueling capability from 1985 to 1997 and deployed to provide SAR coverage worldwide, including Keflavík, Iceland, during and after the Gulf War and to the Persian Gulf region from 1990–2003.

In 2003, the parent unit for the 304 RQS, the 939th Rescue Wing at Portland Air Reserve Station, transitioned from a CSAR mission to an air refueling mission. Re-equipped with KC-135 Stratotanker aircraft the wing was redesignated the 939th Air Refueling Wing (939 ARW) and its HC-130 and HH-60 aircraft were redistributed across the Air Force.  With the loss of a flying mission, the 304 RQS converted into a GUARDIAN ANGEL unit and became a geographically-separated unit (GSU) of the 943rd Rescue Group (943 RQG) at Davis-Monthan AFB, Arizona, the 943 RQG being a GSU of the 920th Rescue Wing (920 RQW) at Patrick AFB, now Patrick SFB, Florida.

Since 2001, personnel from the 304 RQS have deployed in support of both Operation Enduring Freedom and Operation Iraqi Freedom.

Lineage
 Constituted as the 304th Air Rescue Squadron on 24 October 1957
 Activated in the reserve on 16 November 1957
 Redesignated 304th Aerospace Rescue and Recovery Squadron on 18 January 1966
 Redesignated 304th Air Rescue Squadron on 1 April 1990
 Redesignated 304th Rescue Squadron on 1 February 1992

Assignments
 2343d Air Reserve Flying Center, 16 November 1957
 2346th Air Reserve Flying Center, 1 December 1957
 2345th Air Reserve Flying Center, 8 April 1958
 Fourth Air Force, 8 April 1960
 Sixth Air Force Reserve Region, 1 September 1960
 Western Air Force Reserve Region, 31 December 1969
 403d Aerospace Rescue and Recovery Wing (later 403 Rescue and Weather Reconnaissance Wing), 15 March 1976
 939th Aerospace Rescue and Recovery Group (later 939 Air Rescue Wing, 939 Rescue Wing), 8 April 1985
 939th Operations Group, 1 August 1992
 920th Operations Group, 1 April 2003
 943d Rescue Group, 12 February 2005 – present

Stations
Portland International Airport, Oregon, 16 November 1957 – present

Aircraft

 Grumman SA-16 Albatross (later HU-16) (1958–1971)
 Sikorsky HH-34 (1971–1976)
 Bell HH-1 Huey (1976–1991)
 Bell UH-1 Huey (1979–1987)
 Lockheed HC-130 Hercules (1985–1997)
 Sikorsky HH-3E Jolly Green Giant (1986–1992)
 Sikorsky MH-60 Black Hawk (1991–1992)
 Sikorsky UH-60 Black Hawk (1991–1993)
 Sikorsky HH-60 Pave Hawk (1992–2003)

References

 Notes

Bibliography

 

304
304
1957 establishments in Oregon
Portland International Airport